Francesco Boncompagni Ludovisi (20 October 1886 – 7 June 1955), Prince of Piombino (heir of a former Sovereign Italian State) was an Italian politician. He was born in Foligno in the princely Boncompagni family. He was the 3rd fascist governor of Rome from 1928 to 1935. He served in the Senate of the Kingdom of Italy. He died in Rome, Italy.

References

External links
 

1886 births
1955 deaths
19th-century Italian politicians
20th-century Italian politicians
Mayors of Rome
Members of the Senate of the Kingdom of Italy